The twenty-first series of the British medical drama television series Holby City began Airing on BBC One on 2 January 2019 in the United Kingdom. The series consists of 53 episodes. Kate Hall acts as the series producer for episode one and was replaced by Jane Wallbank from the following episode; Simon Harper is the executive producer. The series is billed as an anniversary year for the drama as it celebrates twenty years since its launch. The series also features a crossover episode with sister show Casualty, an episode written by the show's co-creator Tony McHale and the show's 1000th episode, due to be broadcast in November 2019. Thirteen actors reprise their roles from the previous series and former cast members return for guest stints throughout the series. Three new regular characters were also introduced, while Nic Jackman was promoted to the main cast in his role as foundation doctor Cameron Dunn.

Episodes

Production 

The series commenced on 2 January 2019 on BBC One and normally airs on Tuesday nights, although episode 1 and 12 were originally broadcast on a Wednesday evening. Episode 11 was also postponed by a week due to a vote on ongoing Brexit negotiations, and the following episode was consequently postponed to the following evening. Simon Harper continues his role as the executive producer of the show. Kate Hall serves as the series producer for the opening episode, and was replaced by Jane Wallbank from episode two. The series consists of 53 episodes.

Plans for the series and the show's twentieth anniversary celebrations were announced on 11 December 2018, followed by a trailer for upcoming storylines. The series commences with a standalone episode focusing on three of the show's longest-serving characters: Ric Griffin (Hugh Quarshie), Jac Naylor (Rosie Marcel) and Sacha Levy (Bob Barrett). The episode is billed as "funny, sad and celebratory" and sees the characters at an awards ceremony. Harper confirmed that former characters would return throughout the series. He explained that the series would feature "a whole anniversary year of treats which celebrate the new, but also pay homage to the old – the show's heritage and history." He also confirmed that the series would feature experimental episodes and an episode written by the show's co-creator Tony McHale. Additionally, Harper announced plans for the show's 1000th episode, to air on 5 November 2019.

Crossovers 

This series features crossover events with Holby City sister show Casualty. In August 2018, Lucy Raffety, the series producer of Casualty, told Sophie Dainty of Digital Spy that Harper enjoys the crossover events between the two dramas and wanted to produce more. She also teased some "extremely exciting crossovers". In a December 2018 interview with Dainty, Harper promised further crossovers between Holby City and Casualty, and teased an "exciting" event to be aired in spring 2019.

On 15 February 2019, it was announced that Holby City would crossover with sister show Casualty for two episodes, billed as "CasualtyXHolby", in March as part of the anniversary celebrations. The episodes are billed as "dramatic [and] action-packed". Both episodes were written by Michelle Lipton and directed by Steve Brett. The episodes see the hospital attacked by a cyber-virus, destroying all electric systems. A predominant story in the episodes follows Jac and former Holby City character Connie Beauchamp (Amanda Mealing), who appears in Casualty, saving the lives of colleagues after two separate major incidents, despite only having one available theatre. Harper described the episode as "pure, nail-biting, taut, emotional medical drama". He also praised the production teams of both shows for their logical creation of the episodes, and looked forward to exploring the interactions between the characters from the two shows.

Twelve Holby City regular cast members - Marcel (Jac Naylor), Barrett (Sacha Levy), Quarshie (Ric Griffin), Guy Henry (Henrik Hanssen), Catherine Russell (Serena Campbell), Alex Walkinshaw (Adrian "Fletch" Fletcher), Kaye Wragg (Essie Di Lucca), Jaye Jacobs (Donna Jackson), Marcus Griffiths (Xavier "Xav" Duval), Nic Jackman (Cameron Dunn), Camilla Arfwedson (Zosia Self), and Belinda Owusu (Nicky McKendrick) - appear in the Casualty episode of the crossover, originally broadcast on 2 March 2019, alongside the cast of Casualty. The Holby City episode of the crossover, episode 10 of this series, features the Holby City cast alongside nine Casualty regular cast members: Mealing (Connie Beauchamp), Jason Durr (David Hide), Michael Stevenson (Iain Dean), Rebecca Ryan (Gem Dean), Neet Mohan (Rash Masum), Shaheen Jafargholi (Marty Kirkby), Jaye Griffiths (Elle Gardner), Tony Marshall (Noel Garcia), and Maddy Hill (Ruby Spark).

Cast

Overview 
The series began with 13 roles receiving star billing. Guy Henry portrays Henrik Hanssen, the chief executive officer of Holby City Hospital, the show's setting. Catherine Russell plays Serena Campbell, the hospital's medical director, the clinical lead of the Acute Assessment Unit (AAU) and a consultant in general surgery. Hugh Quarshie stars as Ric Griffin, a consultant general surgeon on the unit. Marcus Griffiths acts as Xavier "Zav" Duval, a general surgical registrar on the unit. Jaye Jacobs appears as Donna Jackson, the unit's senior staff nurse. Bob Barrett continues his role as Sacha Levy, a consultant general surgeon and the clinical lead of the general surgery ward, Keller. David Ames portrays Dominic Copeland, Keller ward's general surgical registrar. Kaye Wragg and Lee Mead play Essie Di Lucca and Ben "Lofty" Chiltern, respectively, both staff nurses on the ward. Rosie Marcel features in the series as Jac Naylor, a consultant cardiothoracic surgeon and the clinical lead of the cardiothoracic surgery ward, Darwin. Olga Fedori appears as Frieda Petrenko, a cardiothoracic registrar on Jac's firm. Belinda Owusu portrays Nicky McKendrick, an F2 doctor on Darwin ward, and Alex Walkinshaw stars as Adrian "Fletch" Fletcher, the director of nursing services, based on Darwin ward. Additionally, the semi-regular cast contains Jules Robertson, Zoe Croft and Briana Shann who star as porter Jason Haynes, his wife, Greta Allinson, and Donna's daughter, Mia Barron, respectively.

Episode 13 marks the departure of Frieda following Fedori's decision to leave her role, over one year after her return. The exit was not announced beforehand and was a surprise for the audience. In the narrative, Frieda leaves Holby to work for an aid organisation where she can "make a difference" after facing an "ethical dilemma" following a long-running struggle.

On 19 September 2018, the returns of Camilla Arfwedson and Nic Jackman in their respective roles as cardiothoracic registrar Zosia March and F2 doctor Cameron Dunn were announced. Arfwedson returns for an extended guest stint between episode 8 and episode 16, now credited as Zosia Self. After previously making multiple guest appearances in the show, Jackman joins the regular cast upon his return in episode one. Both actors expressed their delight at reprising their roles. Harper confirmed in December 2018 that he was in discussions with other former cast members about returning during the series. That same month, it was confirmed that Sharon D. Clarke and Denis Lawson would reprise their roles of Lola Griffin, a locum consultant general surgeon, and Tom Campbell-Gore, a consultant cardiothoracic surgeon, respectively in the series. Lawson features in the opening two episodes of the series, and makes a cameo appearance in the third episode. Clarke appears in episode 3 for a single episode. Dom's mother, Carole Copeland (Julia Deakin), returns for a guest appearance in episode 7, before joining the semi-regular cast in episode 13. She becomes involved in a story arc about Dom discovering he is adopted and becomes a receptionist at the hospital. In March 2019, the returns of Marc Elliott and Debbie Chazen as Isaac Mayfield, a general surgical registrar and abusive partner of Dom, and Fleur Fanshawe, a consultant obstetrician, respectively, were announced. Fleur appears in episodes 16 & 28, and Isaac returns from episode 20. On 15 May 2019, it was announced that former cast members Patsy Kensit and Luke Roberts would reprise their roles during the series for a special episode. Kensit portrayed Faye Morton, a ward sister, for three years, while Roberts played Joseph Byrne, a cardiothoracic registrar, for five years. Both actors were excited about returning to film the episode, which Kensit called "gripping".

Series 21 features the introduction of multiple new characters. Accredited actress Dawn Steele joined the cast as Ange Godard, a consultant pediatrician/general surgeon and the clinical lead of the young adult unit (YAU), a new unit that Ange opens in the hospital. Steele described Ange as "a great character with lots to tell". The character debuts in the second episode of the series. In November 2018, it was announced that Amy Lennox had been cast as Ange's daughter, Chloe Godard, a cardiothoracic registrar. Chloe first appears in episode five. It was also announced that Jack Ryder would be introduced as Chloe's on-off boyfriend, Evan Crowhurst, a locum registrar general surgeon. He first appears in episode 11. On 14 January 2019, it was announced that Ramin Karimloo had joined the regular cast as Kian Madani, a consultant cardiothoracic surgeon. Kian shares a backstory with Jac, having attended medical school with her. Karimloo described his character as "dynamic and exciting", while Harper commented, "it's already a joy seeing him stirring things up on Darwin".

The series features several recurring characters, and numerous guest stars. In November 2018, it was announced that Daisy Wood-Davis would appear in one episode of the series as Phoebe Palmer, the sister of Evan. Phoebe appears in episode 14. Sara Stewart stars in the opening episode as cardiothoracic consultant Professor Arianne Cornell, who clashes with Jac. The character previously appeared in an episode of series 20, as well as an episode of Casualty. A show trailer released in December 2018 confirmed guest returns for Patricia Ghraoui (Sirine Saba) and Roman Makarenko (Marko Leht). Roman appears in episode 4, which features the character's death. Patricia appears in episode 9, and was confirmed to be returning in another trailer released in March 2019. Patricia appears again in episode 22. Episode two features the appearance of actress Lorraine Chase in the role of former nurse Cherie Grimes. Television critic Sue Haasler called the character a "touching role" for Chase. Emma Curtis was cast as recurring character Holly Cartwright, a teenage patient involved in a storyline with Ange and Chloe. Holly's parents, Ruth Cooper (Marianne Oldham) and Michael Cartwright (Christopher Harper), were also introduced for the storyline. Holly first appears in episode 5, while Ruth is introduced in episode 6, and Michael debuts in episode 7. All three characters depart in episode 11 at the conclusion of the story.

As part of the crossover episode with Casualty, Francesca Barrett and Naomi Katiyo reprised their roles as Sacha's daughter, Beka Levy, and Ric's granddaughter, Darla Johnstone, respectively. Katiyo continued the role as part of a teenage pregnancy storyline. As part of the story arc, Richard Pepple guest stars in episode 11 as Darla's father, Kofi Johnstone. Fletch's son, Theo Fletcher (Stanley Rabbetts), returns for episodes 11 and 12, where he is kidnapped. Poppy Jhakra reprised her guest role as agency nurse Amira Zafar in episode 12, as did Suzette Llewellyn in the role of Xavier's mother, Nanette Duval. Having guest appeared in the previous series, Angela Lonsdale' character, "Scary" Sue Buchanan, was reintroduced for episodes 17 and 18 as the new clinical nurse manager of the AAU. Guest actor Geoff Leesley was cast in the role of Jon Mayfield, the father of Isaac, and appears from episode 21. Hamish Clark reprises his guest role as Ken Davies, a former patient and Jac's friend, in episodes 21 and 22. Episode 23 features the return of guest artist Dana Smit as Hanssen's daughter-in-law, Sara Johannsen, and the first appearance of child actor Harry Weston as Sara's son and Hanssen's grandson, Oskar Johanssen.

Main characters 
 David Ames as Dominic Copeland
 Bob Barrett as Sacha Levy
 Olga Fedori as Frieda Petrenko
 Marcus Griffiths as Xavier "Zav" Duval
 Guy Henry as Henrik Hanssen
 Nic Jackman as Cameron Dunn
 Jaye Jacobs as Donna Jackson
 Ramin Karimloo as Kian Madani
 Amy Lennox as Chloe Godard
 Rosie Marcel as Jac Naylor
 Jo Martin as Max McGerry
 Lee Mead as Ben "Lofty" Chiltern
 Belinda Owusu as Nicky McKendrick
 Hugh Quarshie as Ric Griffin
 
 Dawn Steele as Ange Godard
 Alex Walkinshaw as Adrian "Fletch" Fletcher
 Kaye Wragg as Essie Di Lucca

Recurring characters 
 Camilla Arfwedson as Zosia Self
 Charlie Condou as Ben Sherwood
 Zoe Croft as Greta Allinson
 Emma Curtis as Holly Cartwright
 Julia Deakin as Carole Copeland
 Marc Elliott as Isaac Mayfield
 Christopher Harper as Michael Cartwright
 Geoff Leesley as Jon Mayfield
 Angela Lonsdale as "Scary" Sue Buchanan
 Marianne Oldham as Ruth Cooper
 Jules Robertson as Jason Haynes
 Jack Ryder as Evan Crowhurst
 Sirine Saba as Patricia Ghraoui
 Briana Shann as Mia Barron
 Harry Weston as Oskar Johanssen

Guest characters 
 Francesca Barrett as Beka Levy
 Paul Bradley as Elliot Hope
 Lorraine Chase as Cherie Grimes
 Debbie Chazen as Fleur Fanshawe
 Hamish Clark as Ken Davies
 Sharon D. Clarke as Lola Griffin
 Jane Crawshaw as Abigail Robins
 Jason Durr as David Hide
 Jaye Griffiths as Elle Gardner
 Maddy Hill as Ruby Spark
 Shaheen Jafargholi as Marty Kirkby
 Poppy Jhakra as Amira Zafar
 Naomi Katiyo as Darla Johnstone
 Patsy Kensit as Faye Morton
 Adam Kotz as Jonathan Robins
 Denis Lawson as Tom Campbell-Gore
 Marko Leht as Roman Makarenko
 Suzette Llewellyn as Nanette Duval
 Tony Marshall as Noel Garcia
 Amanda Mealing as Connie Beauchamp
 Neet Mohan as Rash Masum
 Richard Pepple as Kofi Johnstone
 Patricia Potter as Diane Lloyd
 Stanley Rabbetts as Theo Fletcher
 Luke Roberts as Joseph Byrne
 Rebecca Ryan as Gem Dean
 Dana Smit as Sara Johannsen
 Michael Stevenson as Iain Dean
 Sara Stewart as Professor Arianne Cornell
 Daisy Wood-Davis as Phoebe Palmer

Notes

References
General

 Final viewing figures: 

Specific

External links
 Holby City at BBC Online
 Holby City at the Internet Movie Database

21
2019 British television seasons